Caryl of the Mountains is a 1936 American film directed by Bernard B. Ray. It was made for Reliable Pictures and shot at Big Bear Lake, California.

The film is also known as Get That Girl in the United Kingdom.

Plot
Somewhere in the United States Enos Colvin schemes to defraud his investors and abscond with the assets of his company that are in the form of bonds. His secretary Caryl decides to take the bonds herself and post them to her Uncle Jean living in the Canadian woods.  Discovering what Caryl has done and knowing where the bonds have been posted Enos goes himself to Canada to get the bonds from Uncle Jean who has hidden them in a secret location in his hearth. A struggle ensues and Jean is murdered and his dog Rinty wounded by Enos' revolver.

Making his way to the local Royal Canadian Mounted Police, Rinty is nursed back to health until he is able to bring Enos to justice.

Cast
 Rin Tin Tin, Jr. as Rinty
 Ralph Bushman billed as Francis X. Bushman Jr. as RCMP Sergeant Brad Sheridan
 Lois Wilde as Caryl Foray
 Josef Swickard as Jean Foray
 Earl Dwire as RCMP Inspector Bradshaw
 Robert Walker as Enos Colvin
 George Chesebro as RCMP Constable Jim O'Brien
 Ray Henderson as RCMP Constable Gary
 Steve Clark as RCMP Captain Edwards

Artie Ortego appears uncredited as Indian Joe.

External links
 
 

1936 films
1930s children's adventure films
American children's adventure films
Northern (genre) films
American black-and-white films
Royal Canadian Mounted Police in fiction
Films about dogs
Films directed by Bernard B. Ray
Reliable Pictures films
Films about animals
Rin Tin Tin
1930s English-language films
1930s American films